Beaufort was a railway station on the Morristown and Erie Railway in Roseland, New Jersey in the United States. The same name is also rarely used for the neighborhood of southwestern Roseland near the former railway station. The station building currently houses the Orange-Alden Fuel Company.  That address is 10 Eisenhower Parkway in Roseland and is near the Livingston border. The Beaufort station was located not far from what is today Beaufort Avenue in Livingston. Before the Eisenhower Parkway was built Beaufort Avenue continued from Livingston to Eagle Rock Avenue in Roseland.

The station was started in 1904 when residents of the neighborhood constructed a wooden shed to serve as a station along the M&E, whose passengers were familiar with multiple flag stop stations along the line but wanted regularly scheduled service to their neighborhood. Eventually the Morristown and Erie Railway company constructed the station building that stands today. Passenger service along the line stopped in 1928.

See also 
 Becker Farm Railroad - miniature railway was nearby in Roseland
 Erie Railroad
 Morristown and Erie Railway
 Whippany Railway Museum

References

External links 
 

Roseland, New Jersey
Railway stations in Essex County, New Jersey
Former railway stations in New Jersey
1904 establishments in New Jersey
Railway stations in the United States opened in 1904
Railway stations closed in 1928